Ocean Ranger is a 1988 video game published by Activision.

Gameplay
Ocean Ranger is a game in which several war zones are involved in naval combat.

Reception
David Wilson reviewed the game for Computer Gaming World, and stated that "While Ocean Ranger should by no means be considered a "serious" wartime simulation, it can certainly be considered "serious" fun. It is challenging, fast-paced, and graphically interesting."

References

External links
Review in Compute!'s Gazette
Review in Info
Review in Commodore Magazine
Review in RUN Magazine

1988 video games
Activision games
Commodore 64 games
DOS games
Naval video games
Simulation video games
Video games developed in the United States